Petrelik is a village in Hadzhidimovo Municipality, in Blagoevgrad Province, Bulgaria. Most recently, in 2017,  it has been the site of the German-Bulgarian film  Western

Geography

The village of Petrelik is located in a mountainous area in the mountain of Slavyanka. The river Matnitsa flows along the village. It is just 3 km from the Greek border and 4 km south of the municipal centre Hadzhidimovo.

References

Villages in Hadzhidimovo Municipality